Ace's & Deuce's Lounge is a lounge and dive bar located on Fifth Avenue in Uptown Pittsburgh, Pennsylvania, United States.

Police raid

On March 18, 2022, It was reported that the Allegheny County Health Department would shut down Ace's and Deuce's Lounge temporarily after a raid by the Pennsylvania State Police, as part of their "Nuisance Bar Task Force" search, uncovered a cache of drugs (suspected to be cocaine and cannabis) as well as 2 stolen firearms.

See also
List of dive bars

References

Dive bars in the United States
Restaurants in Pittsburgh
Drinking establishments in Pennsylvania